Harry Aldrich Rabenhorst (April 30, 1898 – March 24, 1972) was an American football player, coach of football, basketball, and baseball, and college athletics administrator. 

A native of Baton Rouge, Louisiana, he served as the head basketball coach at Louisiana State University (LSU) from 1925 to 1942 and again from 1945 to 1957.  Rabenhorst was also the head baseball coach at LSU from 1927 to 1942 and again from 1946 to 1946 as well as the school's athletic director from 1967 to 1968. His 1935 LSU basketball team won a national championship and his 1953 squad reached the Final Four. 

Rabenhorst played college football at Wake Forest as a fullback from 1917 to 1920, captaining the team for three seasons. Rabenhorst holds the record for longest punt in football history. On Thanksgiving Day 1919, against North Carolina State, Rabenhorst got off a world record 115-yard punt that sailed 85 yards in the air. Rabenhorst is credited as Wake Forest's head coach of record for the 1918 and 1919 seasons. 

In 1925, Rabenhorst began a very long and successful career at LSU as the head coach of the men's basketball team. Two years later, in 1927, he also became the head baseball coach. Along with his successes in basketball, he also won two SEC baseball titles (1939 and 1946). As a reward for his team's success on the baseball diamond, Rabenhorst was named SEC Coach of the Year in 1939 and 1946, as well. Rabenhorst stepped down as baseball and basketball coach in 1942 when he left to serve in World War II. Upon his return, he again coached the baseball team from 1946 until 1956 and the basketball team from 1946 to 1957. He finished his baseball coaching career with a record of 220–226–3.

Accolades
Rabenhorst is a member of the LSU Athletics Hall of Fame and Louisiana Sports Hall of Fame.

Head coaching record

College football

College basketball

College baseball

See also
 List of NCAA Division I Men's Final Four appearances by coach

References

External links
 

1898 births
1972 deaths
American football fullbacks
LSU Tigers and Lady Tigers athletic directors
LSU Tigers baseball coaches
LSU Tigers basketball coaches
LSU Tigers football coaches
New Mexico Military Broncos football coaches
Wake Forest Demon Deacons football coaches
Wake Forest Demon Deacons football players
College men's basketball head coaches in the United States
High school football coaches in North Carolina
Sportspeople from Baton Rouge, Louisiana
Players of American football from Baton Rouge, Louisiana
Coaches of American football from Louisiana
Baseball coaches from Louisiana
Basketball coaches from Louisiana